Jacquie Greco (born May 30, 1991) is an American professional ice hockey player for the Professional Women's Hockey Players Association (PWHPA). Previously played for the Buffalo Beauts of the National Women's Hockey League (NWHL).

Personal life
Greco is a graduate of Syracuse University, where she played in the NCAA for four seasons between 2009 and 2013. Greco was co-captain for the women's ice hockey team in her senior year.

As a student at Syracuse University, Greco helped design the 'Tock' app in 2014. The app won the Syracuse University's Fast Forward competition and $7,500 at the Raymond von Dran IDEA Awards.

NWHL
Greco joined the squad for the Buffalo Beauts in the 2016/17 NWHL season. Greco scored her first NWHL goal on 3 December 2016 against the New York Riveters. As a player with the Buffalo Beauts, Greco won the 2017 Isobel Cup.

References

External links
 

1991 births
American women's ice hockey defensemen
Buffalo Beauts players
Isobel Cup champions
Living people
Syracuse Orange women's ice hockey players
Professional Women's Hockey Players Association players